KNKJ-LP is a low power radio station licensed to Calvary Chapel Red Bluff. It broadcasts out of Red Bluff, California.

History
KNKJ-LP began broadcasting on March 13, 2014.

References

External links
 

Red Bluff, California
2015 establishments in California
NKJ-LP
Radio stations established in 2015
NKJ-LP